Jason Orville Pridie (born October 9, 1983) is an American former professional baseball outfielder. He has previously played in Major League Baseball (MLB) with the Tampa Bay Rays, Minnesota Twins, New York Mets, Philadelphia Phillies, Baltimore Orioles, Colorado Rockies, and Oakland Athletics.

Baseball career

Tampa Bay Rays
Pridie was drafted out of Prescott High School, where he hit a record-setting 13 triples, by the Tampa Bay Devil Rays in the second round (43rd overall) of the 2002 Major League Baseball Draft. After signing with the Devil Rays, Pridie was assigned to play with the Rookie League Princeton Devil Rays. In 67 games, he batted .368 with 7 home runs. Pridie was promoted on August 28, to the Hudson Valley Renegades, the Devil Rays' Single-A team. He finished the season there and batted .344 with 1 home run in 8 games. Baseball America named Pridie to the Rookie League All-Star team and also rated him as the best hitter and the best tools player in the Devil Rays' organization.

Playing in 128 games during both seasons, Pridie hit .260 with seven home runs in 2003 and .276 with 17 home runs in 2004. Pridie was also rated by Baseball America as the best defensive outfielder in the Rays' organization. In , he began the season with the Single-A Visalia Oaks. He played just one game before being on the disabled list for three and a half months from April 9 to July 26. Immediately upon being activated from the disabled list, he was promoted to the Double-A Montgomery Biscuits. He finished the season for the Biscuits and played in 28 games for them, batting .213 with 3 home runs.

On December 8, the Minnesota Twins selected Pridie in the Rule 5 Draft. Without enough roster room for Pridie, the Twins sent him back to the Rays on March 29, . In the  season, Pridie played in 132 games and batted .230 with 5 home runs with the Biscuits. He also began the  season in Double-A, playing in 71 games and batted .290 with 4 home runs. After Dustan Mohr's promotion to the Devil Rays on June 27, Pridie was sent to the Triple-A Durham Bulls to take his roster spot. He finished the season with the Bulls, posting a .318 batting average with 10 home runs. While in Durham, Pridie was the focal point of an unofficial Bulls fanclub named "Pridie's Pack."

Minnesota Twins
On November 20, 2007, the Rays purchased Pridie's contract, protecting him from the Rule 5 draft. Eight days later, the Rays traded Pridie along with Delmon Young and Brendan Harris to the Minnesota Twins for Matt Garza, Jason Bartlett, and Eduardo Morlan.

Pridie began the  season with the Twins' Triple-A Rochester Red Wings. On July 12, he hit a go-ahead grand slam in the top of the ninth, and another go- ahead solo home run in the top of the 13th inning to give the Red Wings a 9–8 win at Durham.

He received a September call-up, and made his major league debut on September 3 against the Toronto Blue Jays as a pinch runner for Delmon Young, and scored on a Joe Mauer double. He remained in the game in right field, and committed a game-tying error with two outs in the ninth inning, allowing the game (eventually won by the Jays) to go into extra innings. He remained with the club for the rest of the season, but did not have a hit in six plate appearances.

His only major league appearance in 2009 was as a pinch runner against the Houston Astros on June 20.

New York Mets
On February 9, Pridie was claimed off waivers by the New York Mets.  The Mets purchased his contract on April 22, when starting center fielder Angel Pagan was placed on the 15-day Disabled List.  On April 23, Pridie collected his first major league hit off Diamondbacks pitcher Barry Enright. The very next day, he hit a 3-run home run, the first of his career, off Armando Gallaraga. He hit .241 for the Mets with 4 home runs in 101 games.  After the season, he was out-righted to Triple-A Buffalo, but elected free agency.

Oakland Athletics
The Oakland Athletics signed Pridie to a minor league contract with an invitation to spring training on November 15. On March 9, Pridie was suspended for 50 games for violating the minor league drug-testing policy.  He was granted free agency on June 4.

Philadelphia Phillies
On June 15, the Philadelphia Phillies signed Pridie to a minor league contract, and assigned him to the Triple-A Lehigh Valley IronPigs.  After batting .370 in 13 games with Lehigh Valley, Pridie was called up to Philadelphia to fill the roster spot vacated by Jim Thome on June 30.  He hit his first home run with the Phillies on July 8 against the Atlanta Braves. Pridie was designated for assignment by the Phillies on July 22. On October 6, he elected free agency.

Baltimore Orioles
In October 2012, Pridie signed a Minor League deal with the Baltimore Orioles for the 2013 season. The Orioles purchased Pridie's contract from the Triple-A Norfolk Tides on September 25 when Manny Machado was placed on the 60-day disabled list. After the season, Pridie was non-tendered by Baltimore, becoming a free agent.

Colorado Rockies
Pridie signed a minor league deal with the Colorado Rockies in December 2013. He was designated for assignment on August 6, 2014. Pridie elected free agency on October 12, 2014.

Oakland Athletics

Pridie signed a minor league deal with the Oakland Athletics on January 10, 2015. He played the majority of the 2015 season with the Triple-A Nashville Sounds, but played six games for Oakland after being called up to the major league club on September 1. He was released after the season.

Arizona Diamondbacks
Pridie signed a minor league deal with the Arizona Diamondbacks on December 9, 2016. He was released on March 29, 2017.

Pericos de Puebla
On May 7, 2017, Pridie signed with the Pericos de Puebla of the Mexican Baseball League. He was released on May 15.

References

External links

1983 births
Living people
People from Prescott, Arizona
Baseball players from Phoenix, Arizona
Major League Baseball outfielders
Minnesota Twins players
New York Mets players
Philadelphia Phillies players
Baltimore Orioles players
Colorado Rockies players
Oakland Athletics players
Princeton Devil Rays players
Hudson Valley Renegades players
Charleston RiverDogs players
Visalia Oaks players
Montgomery Biscuits players
Durham Bulls players
Rochester Red Wings players
Gulf Coast Mets players
Buffalo Bisons (minor league) players
Lehigh Valley IronPigs players
Norfolk Tides players
Colorado Springs Sky Sox players
Tigres de Aragua players
American expatriate baseball players in Venezuela
Nashville Sounds players
Hiroshima Toyo Carp players
American expatriate baseball players in Japan
Pericos de Puebla players
American expatriate baseball players in Mexico